William de Vesci was the son of Eustace fitz John, who died in 1184.

William de Vesci or William de Vescy may refer to:

William de Vesci (d.1253), son of Eustace de Vesci
William de Vesci (d.1297), son of William de Vesci
William de Vescy of Kildare, illegitimate son of William de Vesci (d.1297), killed during the Battle of Bannockburn